The Midland Railway 1000 Class is a class of 4-4-0 steam locomotive designed for passenger work. They were known to reach speeds of up to 85 mph (137 km/h).

Overview

These were developed from a series of five locomotives (2631–2635) introduced in 1902 by Samuel Waite Johnson, which had a 3-cylinder compound arrangement on the Smith system, with one high-pressure cylinder inside the frames and two low-pressure cylinders outside, and used Smith's starting arrangement. On the first two locomotives independent control of high-pressure and low-pressure valve gears was available. From 1905 onwards, Johnson's successor Richard Deeley built an enlarged and simplified version, eliminating all the Smith refinements and fitting his own starting arrangement, making the engines simpler to drive. These locomotives were originally numbered 1000–1029, but in the 1907 renumbering scheme the five Smith/Johnson locomotives became 1000–1004 and the Deeley compounds 1005–1034. Ten more of these were added in 1908–1909. The original Johnson locomotives were all subsequently renewed as Deeley compounds, including the now-preserved 1000 which was rebuilt and outshopped with a superheater in 1914.

Numbered 1000–1044 by both the Midland and LMS companies, British Railways renumbered the Midland series of compounds 41000–41044 after nationalisation in 1948.

LMS compound locomotives

After the grouping, the LMS continued to build slightly modified MR Compounds as the LMS Compound 4-4-0.

Accidents and incidents
Locomotive No. 1042 was hauling an express passenger train that collided with the wreckage at low speed. Four people were killed.

On 19 January 1918, locomotive No. 1010 was hauling an express passenger train that was derailed when it ran into a landslip obstructing the line at Little Salkeld, Cumberland. Seven people were killed and 46 were injured.
On 10 July 1933, locomotive No. 1010 was hauling an express passenger train that was in a side-long collision with a freight train at Little Salkeld due to a signalman's error. One person was killed and about 30 were injured, one seriously.
On 12 April 1947, locomotive No. 1004 was hauling a passenger train which was derailed near Keighley, Yorkshire when a bridge collapsed under it.
On 21 April 1952, locomotive No. 41040 was one of two hauling a passenger train that was derailed at Blea Moor Loops, West Riding of  Yorkshire when a defective brake hanger on the locomotive caused a set of points to move under the train.

Preservation

No. 1000 was set aside for preservation after withdrawal in 1951 and restored in 1959 close to its 1914 condition, painted in Midland maroon livery, running enthusiasts' specials until placed in the temporary Clapham Transport museum. Though steamed since preservation, it is currently a static exhibit at the Barrow Hill Engine Shed at Derbyshire, having been lent by the National Railway Museum in York.

Other compound locomotives with the same 3-cylinder layout

 Nord 3.101 (renumbered 3.395 in 1909) mixed traffic 2-6-0 prototype built 1887 by the French Chemins de Fer du Nord to the design of Edouard Sauvage - withdrawn in 1929
 NER Class 3CC number 1619 of the North Eastern Railway 4-4-0 express locomotive rebuilt in 1898  from a 2-cylinder compound. This was W.M. Smith's first application of his patent compound system.
 Four Robinson 4-4-2 Atlantic locomotives, classes 8D and 8E, built 1905–1906 as Smith compounds for the British Great Central Railway.
 One 4-6-2 locomotive (No. 900) built by the North British Locomotive Company for the Cape Government Railway in South Africa.
 Five 4-4-0 locomotives (GNRI Class V) designed by G.T Glover and built in 1932 for the Great Northern Railway (Ireland). These used the Deeley starting arrangement.
 André Chapelon's 4-8-4 SNCF 242 A 1
  CSD  476.0/932.3   4-8-2 1949

References

Sources
 Ian Allan ABC of British Railways Locomotives, 1948 Edition, part 3, pp 5–6
 
 Nock O.S. (1964), "The Midland Compounds"; David & Charles, Dawlish, U.K.

External links 

 Class 4P-B Details at Rail UK

1000
4-4-0 locomotives
Compound locomotives
Railway locomotives introduced in 1902
Standard gauge steam locomotives of Great Britain
Three-cylinder compound steam locomotives
2′B n3v locomotives
2′B h3v locomotives
Passenger locomotives